Charles "Chuck" Aleksinas (born February 26, 1959) is an American former professional basketball player in the National Basketball Association (NBA). He was drafted by the Chicago Bulls in the fourth round (76th pick overall) of the 1982 NBA draft and played one season in 1984–85 for the Golden State Warriors. Aleksinas currently resides in Morris, Connecticut and has played in many local amateur basketball leagues. He played the center position.

Born in Litchfield, Connecticut, Aleksinas played at Wamogo High School where he was the first 1,000 point scorer in the school's history.  He played college basketball at the University of Kentucky and the University of Connecticut. 

Aleksinas is of Lithuanian descent and wanted to play for their national team, but this attempt was denied by FIBA, because he did not have a Lithuanian citizenship for at least three years.

References

External links

1959 births
Living people
American expatriate basketball people in Italy
American expatriate basketball people in Spain
American men's basketball players
American people of Lithuanian descent
Basketball players from Connecticut
CB Estudiantes players
CB Zaragoza players
Centers (basketball)
Chicago Bulls draft picks
Golden State Warriors players
Kentucky Wildcats men's basketball players
Liga ACB players
People from Litchfield, Connecticut
UConn Huskies men's basketball players